The 1930 Ohio gubernatorial election was held on November 4, 1930. Democratic nominee George White defeated incumbent Republican Myers Y. Cooper with 52.80% of the vote.

General election

Candidates
George White, Democratic
Myers Y. Cooper, Republican

Results

References

1930
Ohio
Gubernatorial